This is a list of fighter aces in World War II from New Zealand. An "ace" is generally considered to be any pilot who has downed five or more enemy aircraft. Historians have gleaned figures from combat reports, unit histories, personnel records, and award citations, which sometimes recorded the pilot’s tally of victories at the time the decoration was recommended. The top-scoring New Zealand ace of World War II, Colin Gray, is generally credited with 28 victories, that is 27 solo "kills" and two shared. Records were also kept for the shooting down of V-1 flying bombs, with the most successful New Zealander being Arthur Umbers, who is credited with destroying 28 V-1s, in addition to 4 solo aerial victories and one shared.

List

Table notes

Abbreviations 
 "KIA" in Notes means Killed in action (dates are included where possible).
 "KIFA" in Notes means Killed in Flying Accident.
 "MIA" in Notes means Missing in action.
 "WIA" in Notes means Wounded in action.
 "POW" in Notes means Prisoner of War.

Awards

See also
 List of World War II flying aces by country

Notes

Footnotes

Citations

References 

New Zealand
World War II flying aces